Batrachorhina grisea is a species of beetle in the family Cerambycidae. It was described by William Lucas Distant in 1905. It is known from South Africa.

References

Batrachorhina
Beetles described in 1905